Thelocactus hastifer is a species of plant in the family Cactaceae. It is endemic to Mexico.  Its natural habitat is hot deserts.

References

hastifer
Flora of Mexico
Vulnerable plants
Taxonomy articles created by Polbot